Holy Camp! is a 2017 Spanish musical comedy film directed by Javier Ambrossi and Javier Calvo. It is the film adaptation of the musical of the same name, which was also written and directed by Ambrossi and Calvo and has been running for several seasons in the Madrid theater Teatro Lara. As of November 2020, the film is available to view on Netflix.

Plot
Sister Milagros and Mother Bernarda are two nuns in charge at the Catholic summer camp La Brújula in Segovia. Mother Bernarda is seeking to modernize and reach out to youth through music, while Sister Milagros is full of self doubt.

The main characters are María and Susana, two 17-year-old girls who are spending the summer at the camp which they have attended since they were little. They both love reggaeton and "" music; but God's apparitions to and calling of María begin to change all their lives.

Cast

Production
The co-director Javier Ambrossi and the lead actress Macarena García are brother and sister. The film was produced by Apache Films, Sábado Películas and Lo hacemos y ya vemos AIE and it had the participation of TVE and TV3.

The 'Alto del León' camp in the province of Segovia served to portray the fictional Christian 'Campamento La Brújula'.

Reception 
At the 32nd Goya Awards, Holy Camp! was nominated in 5 categories, winning Best Original Song.

See also 
 List of Spanish films of 2017

References

External links
 

2017 films
2017 comedy films
2010s musical comedy films
2010s teen comedy films
Films about summer camps
Films based on musicals
Films set in Castile and León
Films shot in the province of Segovia
Religious comedy films
2010s Spanish-language films
Spanish musical comedy films
Teen musical films
Apache Films films
2010s English-language films
2017 multilingual films
Spanish multilingual films
2010s Spanish films
Films about Catholic nuns